Kadoma District is a district in Zimbabwe.

Location
The district is located in Mashonaland West Province, one of the 10 administrative provinces in Zimbabwe. The coordinates of the district are:18° 18' 0.00"S, 29° 48' 0.00"E (Latitude:18.3000; Longitude:29.8000).

Overview
Kadoma District sits in the middle of a mining region. The chief minerals are gold, copper and nickel. Cam and Motor is the largest gold producer in Zimbabwe's history. Under the present regime, Cam and Motor is owned by Rio Tinto Zimbabwe. Other smaller mines in the district include: (a) Venice Mine (b) Dalny Mine (c) Brompton Mine (d) Pickstone Mine (e) Etna Mine (f) Patchway Mine (g) Magisa Mines (h) Savannah Mines and (i) Gatawa Mines. Cotton is grown in the district and there was some development of related industries before 1990. The David Whithead Textile Manufacturing Company was opened in 1952.

Population
The current population of Kadoma District is not publicly known. In 2002, the district population was estimated at 235,531 people. The next national population census in Zimbabwe is scheduled from 18 August 2012 through 28 August 2012.

See also
 Districts of Zimbabwe
 Provinces of Zimbabwe

References

 
Districts of Mashonaland West Province